Ričardas Berankis was the defending champion, but chose not to participate.
Gilles Müller won this tournament, defeating Matthias Bachinger 7–6(4), 6–2 in the final.

Seeds

Main draw

Finals

Top half

Bottom half

References
Main Draw
Qualifying Draw

Aegon Trophy - Singles
2011 Men's Singles